Hegra, known to Muslims as Al-Hijr, also known as Mada’in Salih, is an archaeological site located in the area of Al-'Ula within Medina Province in the Hejaz region, Saudi Arabia. A majority of the remains date from the Nabataean Kingdom (1st century AD). The site constitutes the kingdom's southernmost and second largest city after Petra (now in Jordan), its capital city. Traces of Lihyanite and Roman occupation before and after the Nabatean rule, respectively, can also be found.

The Quran places the settlement of the area by the Thamudi people during the days of Salih, between those of Nuh (Noah) and Hud on one hand, and those of Ibrahim (Abraham) and Musa (Moses) on the other. However, a definitive historical chronology can not be obtained through the order of verses due to the fact that the Quranic chapters (see surah) deal with different subjects in non-chronologic order. According to the Islamic text, the Thamudis were punished by God for their idolatry, struck by an earthquake and lightning blasts. Thus, the site has earned a reputation as a cursed place—an image which the national government is attempting to overcome as it seeks to develop Mada'in Salih for its potential for tourism.

In 2008, UNESCO proclaimed Mada'in Salih as a site of patrimony, becoming Saudi Arabia's first World Heritage Site. It was chosen for its well-preserved remains from late antiquity, especially the 131 monumental rock-cut tombs, with their elaborately ornamented façades, of the Nabataean Kingdom.

Name
Its long history and the multitude of cultures occupying the site have produced several names. References by Strabo and other Mediterranean writers use the name Hegra for the Nabatean site. The use of Mada'in Salih refers to the (Prophet) Salih, sent to Ancient Arabs, a name and identity which may be derived from the Biblical Figure Methuselah ( Məṯūšélaḥ, in pausa  Məṯūšālaḥ "Man of the javelin" or "Death of Sword";  Mathousalas)

Although Hegra was for a long time not as important as Dedan, foreigners appear to have called the oasis Hegra. For example, the famous statue of the Achaemenid king Darius the Great made in Egypt and erected in Susa calls the Arabs hgr.

The word "hgr" (Hegra) on an Egyptian-style statue of the Persian king Darius

Location
Al-Istakhri wrote in "Al-Masalik":

The site is on a plain, at the foot of a basalt plateau, which forms a portion of the Hijaz mountains. The setting is notable for its desert landscape, marked by sandstone outcroppings of various sizes and heights.

History

Pre-Dedanite era

In the Qur'an
According to Islam the site of Al-Hijr was settled by the tribe of Thamud, who "(took) for (themselves) palaces from its plains and (carved) from the mountains, homes". The tribe fell to idol worship, and oppression became prevalent. Salih, to whom the site's name of "Mada'in Salih" is often attributed, called on the Thamudis to repent. The Thamudis disregarded the warning and instead commanded Salih to summon a pregnant she-camel from the back of a mountain. And so a pregnant she-camel was sent to the people from the back of the mountain, as proof of Salih's divine mission. However, only a minority heeded his words. The non-believers killed the sacred camel instead of caring for it as they were told, and its calf ran back to the mountain from whence it came. The Thamudis were given three days before their punishment was to take place, since they disbelieved and did not heed the warning. Salih and his Monotheistic followers left the city, but the others were punished by God—their souls leaving their lifeless bodies in the midst of an earthquake and lightning blasts.

According to the Qur'an and tradition, the Thamud existed much earlier than the 715BC inscription from Sargon II would suggest. However, recent research in Islamic studies asserts that a definitive chronology of the Thamūd cannot be attained from the Quranic context and that this narrative does not "depict a continuous history of the ancient people, because these are not in any genealogical succession, nor do they interact with one another." Robert Hoyland suggested that their name was subsequently adopted by other new groups that inhabited the region of Mada'in Salih after the disappearance of the original people of Thamud. This suggestion is also supported by the narration of ʿAbdullah ibn ʿUmar and analysis of Ibn Kathir which report that people called the region of Thamud Al-Hijr, while they called the province of Mada'in Salih as Ardh Thamud (Land of Thamud) and Bayt Thamud (house of Thamud). So the term ‘Thamud’ was not applied to the groups that lived in Mada'in Salih, such as Lihyanites and Nabataeans, but rather to the region itself, and according to classical sources, it was agreed upon that the only remaining group of the native people of Thamud are the tribe of Banu Thaqif which inhabited the city of Taif south of Mecca.

Rock writings
Recent archaeological work has revealed numerous rock writings and pictures not only on Mount Athleb, but also throughout central Arabia. They date between the sixth century BC and the fourth century AD and are labelled as being Thamudic. "Thamudic" was the name invented by nineteenth-century scholars for these large numbers of inscriptions which had not yet been properly studied.

Lihyan/Dedanite era
Archaeological traces of cave art on the sandstones and epigraphic inscriptions, considered by experts to be Lihyanite script, on top of the Athleb Mountain, near Hegra (Mada’in Salih), have been dated to the 3rd–2nd century BC, indicating the early human settlement of the area, which has an accessible source of freshwater and fertile soil. The settlement of the Lihyans became a center of commerce, with goods from the east, north and south converging in the locality.

Nabatean era

The extensive settlement of the site took place during the 1st century AD, when it came under the rule of the Nabatean king Aretas IV Philopatris (Al-Harith IV) (9 BC – 40 AD), who made Hegra (Mada’in Salih) the kingdom's second capital, after Petra in the north. The place enjoyed a huge urbanization movement, turning it into a city. Characteristic of Nabatean rock-cut architecture, the geology of Hegra (Mada’in Salih) provided the perfect medium for the carving of monumental structures, with Nabatean scripts inscribed on their façades. The Nabateans also developed oasis agriculture—digging wells and rainwater tanks in the rock and carving places of worship in the sandstone outcroppings. Similar structures were featured in other Nabatean settlements, ranging from southern Syria (region) to the north, going south to the Negev, and down to the immediate area of the Hejaz. The most prominent and the largest of these is Petra.

At the crossroad of commerce, the Nabatean kingdom flourished, holding a monopoly for the trade of incense, myrrh and spices. Situated on the overland caravan route and connected to the Red Sea port of Egra Kome, Hegra, as it was known among the Nabateans, reached its peak as the major staging post on the main north–south trade route.

Roman era
In 106 AD, the Nabatean kingdom was annexed by the contemporary Roman Empire. The Hejaz, which encompasses Hegra, became part of the Roman province of Arabia.

The trading itinerary shifted from the overland north–south axis on the Arabian Peninsula to the maritime route through the Red Sea. Thus, Hegra as a center of trade began to decline, leading to its abandonment. Supported by the lack of later developments based on archaeological studies, experts have hypothesized that the site had lost all of its urban functions beginning in the late Antiquity (mainly due to the process of desertification). In the 1960s and 1970s, evidence was discovered that the Roman legions of Trajan occupied Mada'in Salih in northeastern Arabia, increasing the extension of the Arabia Petraea province of the Romans in Arabia.

The history of Hegra, from the decline of the Roman Empire until the emergence of Islam, remains unknown. It was only sporadically mentioned by travelers and pilgrims making their way to Mecca in the succeeding centuries. Hegra served as a station along the Hajj route, providing supplies and water for pilgrims. Among the accounts is a description made by 14th-century traveler Ibn Battuta, noting the red stone-cut tombs of Hegra, by then known as "al-Hijr." However, he made no mention of human activities there.

Ottoman era

The Ottoman Empire annexed western Arabia from the Mamluks by 1517. In early Ottoman accounts of the Hajj road between Damascus and Mecca, Hegra (Mada’in Salih) is not mentioned, until 1672, when the Turkish traveler, Evliya Celebi noted that the caravan passed through a place called "Abyar Salih" where there were the remains of seven cities. It is again mentioned by the traveler Murtada ibn 'Alawan as a rest stop on the route called "al-Mada'in." Between 1744 and 1757, a fort was built at al-Hijr on the orders of the Ottoman governor of Damascus, As'ad Pasha al-Azm. A cistern supplied by a large well within the fort was also built, and the site served as a one-day stop for Hajj pilgrims where they could purchase goods such as dates, lemons and oranges. It was part of a series of fortifications built to protect the pilgrimage route to Mecca.

According to the researches of Al-Ansari, the Ottoman castle was found near the settlement dating to the year 1600 A.D in 1984

19th century

Following the discovery of Petra by the Swiss explorer Johann Ludwig Burckhardt in 1812, Charles Montagu Doughty, an English traveler, heard of a similar site near Hegra (Mada’in Salih), a fortified Ottoman town on the Hajj road from Damascus. In order to access the site, Doughty joined the Hajj caravan, and reached the site of the ruins in 1876, recording the visit in his journal which was published as Travels in Arabia Deserta. Doughty described the Ottoman fort, where he resided for two months, and noted that Bedouin tribesmen had a permanent encampment just outside of the building.

In the 19th century, there were accounts that the extant wells and oasis agriculture of al-Hijr were being periodically used by settlers from the nearby village of Tayma. This continued until the 20th century, when the Hejaz Railway that passed through the site was constructed (1901–08) on the orders of Ottoman sultan Abdul Hamid II to link Damascus and Jerusalem in the north-west with Medina and Mecca, hence facilitating the pilgrimage journey to the latter and to politically and economically consolidate the Ottoman administration of the centers of Islamic faith. A station was built north of al-Hijr for the maintenance of locomotives, and offices and dormitories for railroad staff. The railway provided greater accessibility to the site. However, this was destroyed in a local revolt during World War I. Despite this, several archaeological investigations continued to be conducted in the site beginning in the World War I period to the establishment of the Kingdom of Saudi Arabia in the 1930s up to the 1960s. The railway station has also been restored and now includes 16 buildings and several pieces of rolling stock.

By the end of the 1960s, the Saudi Arabian government devised a program to introduce a sedentary lifestyle to the nomadic Bedouin tribes inhabiting the area. It was proposed that they settle down in al-Hijr, re-using the already existent wells and agricultural features of the site. However, the official identification of al-Hijr as an archaeological site in 1972 led to the resettlement of the Bedouins towards the north, beyond the site boundary. This also included the development of new agricultural land and freshly dug wells, thereby preserving the state of al-Hijr.

Current development
In 1962, examples of many inscriptions were discovered and renewed the archaeological assessment of Hijr (Mada’in Salih) by Winnett and Reed. Although the Al-Hijr site was proclaimed as an archaeological treasure in the early 1970s, few investigations had been conducted since. Mirdad had lived here for a short time and wrote notices about the region since 1977. Healey studied here in 1985 and wrote a book about the inscriptions of Hijr (Mada’in Salih) in 1993.

The prohibition on the veneration of objects/artifacts has resulted in minimal archaeological activities. These conservative measures started to ease up beginning in 2000, when Saudi Arabia invited expeditions to carry out archaeological explorations as part of the government's push to promote cultural heritage protection and tourism. The archaeological site was proclaimed as a UNESCO World Heritage Site in 2008. More recent archaeological studies of the area have been made as part of efforts to document and preserve the heritage sites prior to opening the area to more tourism.

Architecture

The Nabatean site of Hegra was built around a residential zone and its oasis during the 1st century CE. The sandstone outcroppings were carved to build the necropolis.

Non-monumental burial sites, totaling 2,000, are also part of the place. A closer observation of the façades indicates the social status of the buried person—the size and ornamentation of the structure reflect the wealth of the person. Some façades had plates on top of the entrances providing information about the grave owners, the religious system, and the masons who carved them. Many graves indicate military ranks, leading archaeologists to speculate that the site might once have been a Nabatean military base, meant to protect the settlement's trading activities.

The Nabatean kingdom was not just situated at the crossroad of trade but also of culture. This is reflected in the varying motifs of the façade decorations, borrowing stylistic elements from Assyria, Phoenicia, Egypt and Hellenistic Alexandria, combined with the native artistic style. Roman decorations and Latin scripts also figured on the troglodytic tombs when the territory was annexed by the Roman Empire. In contrast to the elaborate exteriors, the interiors of the rock-cut structures are severe and plain.

A religious area, known as "Jabal Ithlib," is located to the north-east of the site. It is believed to have been originally dedicated to the Nabatean deity Dushara. Small religious sanctuaries bearing inscriptions were also cut into the rock in the vicinity.

The residential area is located in the middle of the plain, far from the outcrops. The primary material of construction for the houses and the enclosing wall was sun-dried mudbrick. Few vestiges of the residential area remain.

Water is supplied by 130 wells, situated in the western and north-western part of the site, where the water table was at a depth of only . The wells, with diameters ranging , were cut into the rock, although some, dug in loose ground, had to be reinforced with sandstone.

Importance
The archaeological site lies in an arid environment. The dry climate, the lack of resettlement after the site was abandoned, and the prevailing local beliefs about the locality have all led to the extraordinary state of preservation of Al-Hijr, providing an extensive picture of the Nabatean lifestyle. Thought to mark the southern extent of the Nabatean kingdom, Al-Hijr's oasis agriculture and extant wells exhibit the necessary adaptations made by the Nabateans in the given environment—its markedly distinct settlement is the second largest among the Nabatean kingdom, complementing that of the more famous Petra archaeological site in Jordan. The location of the site at the crossroads of trade, as well as the various languages, scripts and artistic styles reflected in the façades of its monumental tombs further set it apart from other archaeological sites. It has duly earned the nickname "The Capital of Monuments" among Saudi Arabia's 4,000 archaeological sites.

Tourism
You can book your tour via Experience Al Ula website or app. The tour starts from the Winter park near Al Ula city center and the bus will drive you to the Hegra visitor center where the tour actually starts. The tour consists of 4 stops – the bus will drop you at each of them , a local guide will brief you about the site and then another bus will pick you up. The tour takes around 2 hours. There are also night tours available or private tour in a vintage Land Rovers.

See also

 Iram of the Pillars
 Leuke Kome
 Lihyan
 Nabataeans
 List of colossal sculptures in situ
 Ancient towns in Saudi Arabia
List of World Heritage Sites in Saudi Arabia

Footnotes

Further reading
   
  (I./2003, II./2005, III./2006, IV./2009.)

External links

 World Heritage listing submission
 Explore Hijr: the Archaeological Site of Al-Hijr (Mada'in Salih) in the UNESCO coleection on Google Arts and Culture
 ExperienceAlUla.com (Official Tourism Website)
 Photo gallery at nabataea.net
 Photos from Mauritian photographer Zubeyr Kureemun
 Historical Wonder by Mohammad Nowfal
 Saudi Arabia's Hidden City from France24
 Madain Salah: Saudi Arabia's Cursed City
 Uncovering secrets of mystery civilization in Saudi Arabia – BBC
 "Saudi Arabia’s Al Ula archaeologists unearth Gulf’s first domesticated dogs. The dig at Hegra uncovered remains of human beings and canines dating back 6,000 years. "The National News", March 25, 2021.

Videos
 The Road to Mada'in Salih
 Round in Mada'in Salih : Part1 – Part2 – Part3 – Part4

Nabataea
Nabataean architecture
History of Saudi Arabia
Archaeological sites in Saudi Arabia
Railway museums in Saudi Arabia
World Heritage Sites in Saudi Arabia
Former populated places in Southwest Asia
Arabic architecture
Medina Province (Saudi Arabia)
Tourist attractions in Saudi Arabia
Castles in Saudi Arabia
Rock-cut architecture
Rock-cut tombs
Ancient Greek geography of Arabia